Erwin Spitzner (born 29 April 1994) is a Brazilian football defender who plays for EC São Bernardo.

Biography
Erwin Spitzner was born in São Bento do Sul, Brazil. He started his career in the Clube Atlético Paranaense U19 side and made his senior team debut for Atlético Paranaense on 21 January 2013 against Rio Branco-PR in a 1–1 draw at home. Erwin scored his first goal for his senior team against Operário Ferroviário on 3 March 2013, which Atlético Paranaense won 3–0.

Honours
Copa do Brasil (Runner-up):
2013

References

1994 births
Living people
Brazilian footballers
Association football defenders
Sportspeople from Santa Catarina (state)
Brazilian expatriate footballers
Club Athletico Paranaense players
Kerala Blasters FC players
Esporte Clube Internacional de Lages players
Desportiva Ferroviária players
Foz do Iguaçu Futebol Clube players
Rio Branco Sport Club players
Maringá Futebol Clube players
Esporte Clube São Luiz players
Esporte Clube São Bernardo players
Kerala Blasters FC draft picks
Expatriate footballers in India
Brazilian expatriate sportspeople in India